Sarosa is a genus of moths in the subfamily Arctiinae. The genus was erected by Francis Walker in 1854.

Species
Sarosa acutior (Felder, 1874)
Sarosa albraamea Schaus, 1924
Sarosa annotata Dognin, 1914
Sarosa atritorna Dognin, 1912
Sarosa boenninghauseni Rothschild, 1911
Sarosa connotata Hampson, 1901
Sarosa epona Dognin, 1902
Sarosa flavicostalis Rothschild, 1911
Sarosa ignicornis  Hampson, 1914
Sarosa klagesi  Rothschild, 1911
Sarosa leuce (Maassen, 1890)
Sarosa lutibasis Hampson, 1901
Sarosa mora Schaus, 1911
Sarosa notata (Butler, 1876)
Sarosa ozora (H. Druce, 1883)
Sarosa pompilina Butler, 1876
Sarosa pseudohelotes Rothschild, 1931
Sarosa sesiiformis (Walker, 1854)
Sarosa xanthobasis H. Druce, 1898

References

External links

Arctiinae